The 1998 Kazakhstan Cup Final was the sixth final of the Kazakhstan Cup. The match was contested by Irtysh and Kaisar-Hurricane at Central Stadium in Almaty. The match was played on 10 June 1998 and was the final match of the competition.

Background
Irtysh and Kaisar-Hurricane played the first Kazakhstan Cup Final.

Irtysh and Kaisar-Hurricane three times during the season of league were played. On May 17, 1997 Irtysh has won the first competition to the score 1-0 in the Central Stadium. The only goal was scored by Viktor Antonov. On September 2, 1997 Kaisar-Hurricane has beaten Irtysh with the score 1-0. The goal marked out Seitzhan Baibosynov. In the third match Irtysh was beaten by Kaisar-Hurricane with the score 1-0. The goal was scored by Oleg Malyshev.

Route to the Final

Irtysh

Kaisar-Hurricane

Match

Details

References

1997 domestic association football cups
1997 in Kazakhstani football
1998 domestic association football cups
1998 in Kazakhstani football
Kazakhstan Cup Finals